Yuri Korolyuk (born 10 January 1990) is a Belarusian former professional football player.

External links
 
 

1990 births
Living people
Belarusian footballers
Association football midfielders
FC Dynamo Brest players
FC Granit Mikashevichi players
FC Volna Pinsk players
FC Torpedo-BelAZ Zhodino players
FC Kobrin players
Sportspeople from Brest, Belarus